Christian Cecil Kohlsaat (January 8, 1844 – May 11, 1918) was a United States circuit judge of the United States Court of Appeals for the Seventh Circuit and of the United States Circuit Courts for the Seventh Circuit and previously was a United States district judge of the United States District Court for the Northern District of Illinois.

Education and career

Christian Cecil Kohlsaat was born on January 8, 1844, near Albion, Illinois. He attended the Old University of Chicago (not to be confused with the current University of Chicago, a separate legal entity) and received a Bachelor of Laws from the Old University of Chicago Law Department (now the Northwestern University Pritzker School of Law), then read law to enter the bar in 1867. He was in private practice in Chicago, Illinois, from 1867 to 1890. He was an engrossing clerk for the Illinois General Assembly from 1871 to 1872, and served as a member of the Board of West Park Commissioners. He was a probate judge for Cook County, Illinois, from 1890 to 1899.

Federal judicial service

Kohlsaat was nominated by President William McKinley on February 23, 1899, to a seat on the United States District Court for the Northern District of Illinois vacated by Judge Peter S. Grosscup. He was confirmed by the United States Senate on February 28, 1899, and received his commission the same day. His service terminated on March 24, 1905, due to his elevation to the Seventh Circuit.

Kohlsaat was nominated by President Theodore Roosevelt on March 18, 1905, to the United States Court of Appeals for the Seventh Circuit and the United States Circuit Courts for the Seventh Circuit, to a new joint seat authorized by 33 Stat. 992. He was confirmed by the Senate on March 18, 1905, and received his commission the same day. On December 31, 1911, the Circuit Courts were abolished and he thereafter served only on the Court of Appeals. His service terminated on May 11, 1918, due to his death in Chicago.

References

Sources
 

1844 births
1918 deaths
Illinois state court judges
Judges of the United States District Court for the Northern District of Illinois
Judges of the United States Court of Appeals for the Seventh Circuit
United States federal judges appointed by William McKinley
United States court of appeals judges appointed by Theodore Roosevelt
20th-century American judges
United States federal judges admitted to the practice of law by reading law